Penny Morrell (4 February 1938 – 3 January 2020) was a British actress. She was married to the actor George Cole until his death in 2015.

Death
Penny Morrell died at the Royal Berkshire Hospital, Berkshire, England on 3 January 2020, aged 81.

She is survived by her children Tara and Toby and her grandchildren Harry, Amelia and Thomas.

Selected filmography
Reach for the Sky (1956)
Brothers in Law (1957)
Lucky Jim (1957)
The Bulldog Breed (1960) 
Make Mine Mink (1960) 
Too Hot to Handle (1960)
Out of the Fog (1962)
Mrs. Gibbons' Boys (1962)
A Matter of Choice (1963)
The Wild Affair (1963)
A Stitch in Time (1963)
The Comedy Man (1964)
Smokescreen (1964)
The Early Bird (1965)
The End of the Affair (1999)

Television credits (partial)
Minder - Daphne Mount
An Independent Man - Mrs Bamford
EastEnders
Heartbeat - Mrs. Roberts
ChuckleVision - Lettice / Fairy Godmother
Bramwell (TV mini-series) - Mrs. Landers 
Thomas Hardy's Tess of the d'Urbervilles (1998 TV film) - Rolliver's Landlady 
The Bill (1997) - Sally 
Five Children and It (1991 TV series) - Lady Chittenden
About Face (TV series)  - Deirdre
Valentine Park (1987-1988 TV series)  - Maggie / Claire's Mother
Stiff Upper Lip (1967) 
Theatre 625: Simon and Laura (1966) - Janet Honeyman
The World of Wooster (1966 TV series) - Rhoda 
Marriage Lines (1965 TV series) - Patty
Orlando (1965 TV series)
Detective (1964 TV series) - Betty
 A World of His Own (1964)
Maigret (1961 TV series)
Saturday Playhouse (1959 TV series) - Marlene Cheetah
ITV Play of the Week (1958 TV series) - Jean Smith 
Shadow Squad (1957 TV series) - Isobelle Hughes

Further reading
 https://archive.today/20130129061047/http://mubi.com/topics/3994
 https://www.imdb.com/name/nm0606269/filmoyear

References

External links

1938 births
British actresses
2020 deaths